Letterkenny Residents Party  was an unregistered minor political party in Ireland. It was founded and registered in 2008 to contest the 2009 local elections in Letterkenny. It combined local residents with Francis McCafferty who polled 64 votes standing for the Socialist Party in the 2004 council election. The party's only candidate, Tom Crossan, polled 417 votes and succeeded in being elected to Letterkenny Town Council.

As of 2015, it is no longer a registered political party.

References

2008 establishments in Ireland
2015 disestablishments in Ireland
Defunct political parties in the Republic of Ireland
Organisations based in Letterkenny
Political parties disestablished in 2015
Political parties established in 2008
Residents Party